The World Sportscar Championship raced on 60 different circuits on 6 continents in its 40-year history.  The Nürburgring hosted 36 events, more than any other track.  From 1963 to 1967, the world championship included hillclimbs in Italy, Germany, and Switzerland.

External links
Racing Sports Cars: WSC archive

World Sportscar Championship
World Sportscar Championship